Ingrid A.M. Robeyns (born 1972) holds the Chair Ethics of Institutions at Utrecht University, Faculty of Humanities and the associated Ethics Institute.

Robeyns is also a Fellow of the Human Development and Capability Association (HDCA) and was elected the associations eighth president in April 2017. She is a notable advocate of economic limitarianism (ethical).

Biography 
Robeyns is from Leuven, Belgium. She earned a Belgian licentiate qualification in economics from the Katholieke Universiteit Leuven (KU Leuven) in 1994. She went on to study social and political science in Germany at the Georg August Universität, Göttingen (University of Göttingen). Robeyns returned to the Katholieke Universiteit Leuven for her MSc in economics, which she completed in 1997.

Her doctorate in economics came from the University of Cambridge in 2003. Her dissertation was on gender inequality and the capability approach. Robeyns also has an MA in philosophy from the Open University (2007).

Robeyns claimed dual Dutch/Belgian citizenship in 2013.

Academic career 
In 2006, the Netherlands Organisation for Scientific Research (NWO) awarded her a five-year Vidi grant for research on theories of justice. The research considers what the question of justice means within the welfare state for children, parents and non-parents. In 2018 Robeyns was elected member of the Royal Netherlands Academy of Arts and Sciences.

Publications

See also 
 Feminist economics
 Feminist philosophy
 Feminist theory
 Limitarianism 
 List of feminist economists
 Political philosophy

References

External links 
 Official website

1972 births
Living people
21st-century Dutch philosophers
Alumni of the Open University
Alumni of the University of Cambridge
Belgian political philosophers
Belgian women philosophers
Dutch political philosophers
Dutch women philosophers
Academic staff of Erasmus University Rotterdam
Feminist economists
Harvard University faculty
KU Leuven alumni
Members of the Royal Netherlands Academy of Arts and Sciences
Writers from Leuven
Political philosophers
Academic staff of Utrecht University